Moirangthem Thoiba Singh (born 12 December 2002) is an Indian professional footballer who plays as a midfielder for Indian Super League club Odisha.

He became the youngest player to make a first team debut in Indian football League system at the age of 15. He is also the youngest goalscorer at the AFC Cup, at the age of 16.

Career statistics

Club

References

2002 births
Living people
Footballers from Manipur
People from Bishnupur district
Indian footballers
Association football defenders
RoundGlass Punjab FC players
I-League players
Indian Super League players
Odisha FC players
India youth international footballers